Burrishoole GAA is a Gaelic Athletic Association club located in Newport, County Mayo. The club is exclusively focused on the sport of Gaelic football.

Notable players 
 Jason Doherty

References

External links
Club website (archived 2015)

Gaelic football clubs in County Mayo
Gaelic games clubs in County Mayo